Nanna Merrald Rasmussen (born 8 October 1993) is a Danish dressage rider.  She has qualified for the 2014 Dressage World Cup Final in Lyon after finishing 6th in the Western European League rankings. She was forced to withdraw, though, after her horse Millibar failed to pass the veterinary test.

Merrald Rasmussen represented Denmark at the Olympic Games in Tokyo, Japan with the stallion Blue Hors Zack. She finished 4th with the team and 11th in the individual final. She won a team gold medal at the 2022 World Championships.

References

Living people
1993 births
Danish female equestrians
Danish dressage riders
Equestrians at the 2020 Summer Olympics
Olympic equestrians of Denmark